Two Balloons is a 2017 stop-motion animated short film written and directed by Mark Smith. The film premiered at the 2017 Foyle Film Festival.

Awards

References

External links
  https://www.imdb.com/title/tt7350536/

2017 short films
2017 animated films
2017 films
2010s stop-motion animated films